Japan has 14,125 islands. Approximately 430 are inhabited. This list provides basic geographical data of the most prominent islands belonging or claimed by Japan.

claimed but not controlled

See also 
 Geography of Japan
 List of islands of Japan
 List of islands
 Names of Japan

References 
This article used material from Japanese Wikipedia page 日本の島の一覧, accessed 28 July 2017

Japan, List of islands of
Islands
Lists of islands by area